is a burakumin's rights group in Japan. Buraku are ethnic Japanese and descended from outcast communities of the Japanese feudal era.

History

Pre-World War II period
However, in 1942, some of the leading activists, including Asada Zennosuke (朝田善之助), were recruited into the military. The National Levelers Association disbanded in the same year.

Post-World War II period
In 1955, it was renamed the Buraku Liberation League (BLL).

In 1966, one of the leaders, died. Around the same time, the BLL purged the members who were against the leaders' decision that the subsidy to the burakumin should be limited to the BLL members only (as there are many burakumin who did not join the BLL). Asada played a major role in this purge.

Concession problems

In response to the denuclearization struggle "The reason for fear is not by birth, but because a powerful pressure group because of hanging up and condemnation. It has been said that self-purpose groups fear losing their meaning of existence by achieving their original purpose since late 1960s. "

Akira Koike, a politician and vice chair of the Japanese Communist Party, also said that "the Dowa problem has already been resolved basically by residents' endeavor, continuing unfair dowa measures itself will create new prejudice" and criticized the clamor.  He clarified that such criticism is regarded as "discrimination" is a complete wrong after suppression of free speech by Minister of Reconstruction Ryu Matsumoto concurrently serving as a vice chairperson of Buraku Liberation League.

He criticized Matsumoto's intimidating warning, "Your company is over if you write my words as the essence of the liberation alliance's suppression of free speech."

References

External links

Official website

Burakumin
Human rights organizations based in Japan
Political organizations based in Japan
Organizations established in 1946
1946 establishments in Japan